Cliff Lazarenko (born 16 March 1952) is an English former professional darts player. Nicknamed "Big Cliff" due to his height (193 cm / 6'4") and weight (over 127 kg at his peak), he is known for being a colourful character on and off the stage.

Biography
Lazarenko was born in Liss, Hampshire, growing up in Greatham, where his parents ran a garage. He honed his darts skills in his local pub, The Queen. He later moved to Wellingborough. Before becoming a professional darts player in 1975, he worked as a labourer.

Lazarenko first appeared in a televised match on the show Indoor League in the 1970s. He went on to win several singles and pairs titles. He won the British Open in 1980, winning it again later in the decade, and reached the semi-finals of the World Championship four times. In 1980, he lost out to Bobby George; the next year he gained revenge on George by beating him in the quarter-finals, eventually losing to world champion Eric Bristow. In 1985, he reached the semi-finals again, this time without losing a single set en route, winning the opening round against Singapore's Paul Lim (2–0), the second round against the Swede Stefan Lord (3–0), and the quarter-finals against Northern Irish player Fred McMullan (4–0), but was narrowly defeated in the semi-finals by fellow Englishman John Lowe 5–3. He reached the semis again in 1990, but once again fell short of the final, losing 5–0 to eventual winner Phil Taylor.

Big Cliff made a habit of winning the Dartsathlon (an event made up of having 15 darts at various doubles, trebles, Bullseyes, 25s, and 501 legs) in the early–mid 80s winning the event four times in 1982, 1983, 1985, and 1986. He also won the Autumn Gold Masters in 1984 and 1986, the British Matchplay in 1979, British Gold Cup in 1984, Jersey Open in 1982 and 1983, and the Danish Open in 1981 and 1983. He came to the fore, however, with his 1977 win in the Marlboro Masters.

Lazarenko was one of the sixteen players who defected from the BDO to form the PDC. Although he managed to maintain his popularity with the fans, he never managed to repeat his performances in the PDC World Darts Championship, with several first-round exits to his name, and only managing a quarter-final at best in 1999. In other PDC tournaments, however, Lazarenko showed great promise: he reached the semi-finals of the 1995 World Matchplay, beating Dennis Smith, Shayne Burgess, and Nigel Justice along the way, before losing to Dennis Priestley. He was also a Matchplay quarter-finalist in 2001.

In the mid-2000s, Lazarenko suffered from ill health, losing a lot of weight, and ceased competing in darts tournaments. However, in the 2007 UK Open Darts at the Reebok Stadium in Bolton, Lazarenko made a return to the big stage, and won two matches in one night, en route to the second round. He then won another game the next night, before falling in the third round. In 2008 it was announced that Lazarenko would compete in the BetFred League of Legends along with players including Bristow, Lowe, George, and Bob Anderson. Lazarenko reached the semi-finals of the tournament, losing to Keith Deller.

In popular culture

In the 1981 film An American Werewolf in London, a darts match between Rab Smith and Lazarenko is featured on TV in the flat of the character played by Jenny Agutter.

World Championship performances

BDO
 1978: First round (lost to Hillyard Rossiter)
 1979: First round (lost to Terry O'Dea)
 1980: Semi-final (lost to Bobby George)
 1981: Third place (beat Tony Brown, lost to Eric Bristow in semi-finals)
 1982: Second round (lost to Nicky Virachkul)
 1983: Quarter-final (lost to Jocky Wilson)
 1984: First round (lost to Ceri Morgan)
 1985: Semi-final (lost to John Lowe)
 1986: First round (lost to Dave Lee)
 1987: Quarter-final (lost to John Lowe)
 1988: Second round (lost to Paul Reynolds)
 1989: First round (lost to Wayne Weening)
 1990: Semi-final (lost to Phil Taylor)
 1991: Second round (lost to Dave Whitcombe)

PDC
 1994: Group stage (lost both group games to Alan Warriner and Richie Gardner)
 1995: Group stage (beat Graeme Stoddart but lost to Peter Evison)
 1996: Group stage (lost both group games to Shayne Burgess and Phil Taylor)
 1997: Group stage (lost both group games to Peter Evison and Steve Raw)
 1999: Quarter-final (lost to Shayne Burgess)
 2000: First round (lost to Dennis Smith)
 2001: Second round (lost to Roland Scholten)
 2002: First round (lost to Roland Scholten)
 2003: First round (lost to John Part)
 2004: Second round (lost to Steve Maish)

Career finals

BDO major finals: 1 (1 runner-up)

Performance timeline

References

External links
Cliff Lazarenko's profile and stats on Darts Database

1952 births
Living people
English darts players
People from Liss
British people of Russian descent
British people of Ukrainian descent
Professional Darts Corporation founding players